A false alarm is a hoax report of an emergency.

False Alarm or False Alarms may also refer to:

Music
False Alarm (band), an American punk rock band
False Alarm (album), by Two Door Cinema Club, 2019
False Alarm, a 2004 EP by KT Tunstall
"False Alarm" (The Bronx song), 2003
"False Alarm" (Matoma and Becky Hill song), 2016
"False Alarm" (The Weeknd song), 2016
"False Alarm", a 1984 song by Armored Saint from March of the Saint

Other uses
False Alarms (film), a 1936 short film starring The Three Stooges
False Alarm, a 1994 novel by The Hardy Boys
Happy Tree Friends: False Alarm, the video game based on the cartoon series Happy Tree Friends, which was scheduled to release in Fall of 2007, but then it was pushed back for Spring of 2008
The False Alarm, a 1926 American silent drama film
 Sometimes used as a synonym for Type I error in statistics (see also Statisticians' and engineers' cross-reference of statistical terms)